Takanowaka Yūki (born 2 April 1976 as Yūki Ozaki) is a former sumo wrestler from Ikitsuki, Nagasaki, Japan. His highest rank was sekiwake.

Career
Takanowaka was born as Yūki Ozaki, the son of a professional baseball player. In his youth he played not only baseball but also basketball, for which he was offered several scholarships. He tried sumo at the suggestion of his school's sumo club manager, who had connections with Naruto stable. Takanowaka joined the stable in March 1992, making his debut alongside future sekiwake Wakanosato. As is common, he initially fought under his own surname, soon switching to "Takaozaki" before adopting the fighting name of Takanowaka in 1998. Initially weighing only , it took him several years to work his way through the lower ranks. He was promoted to the second highest jūryō division in May 1999 and reached the top makuuchi division just three tournaments later in November 1999.

Takanowaka was ranked in the top division for 34 tournaments in total, with a win-loss rate of 229–242, with 39 absences. He earned one kinboshi, or gold star, by defeating yokozuna Musashimaru in May 2001, and three special prizes. His best performance was probably in November 2002 when produced a strong 11–4 record at komusubi rank and won his third Fighting Spirit prize. He was promoted to sekiwake in January 2003 and held his rank with a good 9–6 score but missed the whole of the March 2003 tournament with an injury picked up on the last day of the previous basho. As a result, he was demoted to jūryō and although he quickly returned to the top division he never managed to reach the titled san'yaku ranks again. After suffering from torn cartilage in his knees his results took a downward turn. He was demoted to jūryō once again in January 2006 and the unsalaried makushita division in July 2007.

Retirement from sumo
On 22 September 2007 Takanowaka announced his retirement from sumo, after withdrawing from the September tournament with four losses at the rank of makushita 2. His official retirement ceremony took place on 16 February 2008 at the Ryōgoku Kokugikan. He did not stay with the Sumo Association as an elder, and left the sumo world completely. He opened a chanko restaurant in Hirado city.

He was married in February 2013.

Fighting style
Takanowakas favoured kimarite or techniques were hidari-yotsu (a right hand outside, left hand inside grip on the opponent's mawashi or belt), uwatenage (overarm throw) and yorikiri (force out).

Career record

See also
List of sumo tournament top division runners-up
List of sumo tournament second division champions
Glossary of sumo terms
List of past sumo wrestlers
List of sekiwake

References

External links
 

1976 births
Living people
Japanese sumo wrestlers
Sekiwake
Sumo people from Nagasaki Prefecture